{{Infobox martial art
| logo            =
| logocaption     =
| logosize        =
| image           = 
| imagecaption    = 
| imagesize       = 170px
| name            = Nanquan南拳
| aka             = Southern Fist
| focus           = Striking, weapons training
| country         = China
| creator         = No single creator, attirubted to either:
 Martial arts knowledge of Qi Jiguang and Yu Dayou, transformed by Hongmen
 Members of Southern Shaolin Monastery| parenthood      = Shaolin Kung Fu
| descendant arts = * Hung Ga 
 Fujian White Crane
 Southern Snake style
 Lau Gar
 Choy Gar
 Li Gar
 Fut Gar
 Choy Li Fut
 Wing Chun
 Weng Chun
 Mok Gar
| famous_pract    = Yu Dayou, Qi Jiguang, Huang Junhua, Phạm Quốc Khánh, Willy Wang (wushu), Angie Tsang
| olympic         = Wushu (sport)
}}

Nanquan refers to a classification of Chinese martial arts that originated in Southern China. Guangxi Wang (2012), pg. 21 & 22, "Nanquan (southern boxing) originates from a hilly, sub-tropical region. With Fujian and Guangdong as the center, it is common in the area south of the Yangtze River... The Nanquan family took shape in the early-to-mid-Qing Dynasty, from the late seventeenth to late eighteenth century. It includes hundreds of sub forms, and these are widely found in Fujian, Guangdong, Hubei, Hunan and Zheijiag, as well as in Taiwan, Hong Kong and Macau."

The southern styles of Chinese martial arts are characterized by emphasis on "short hitting" and specific arm movements, predominantly in southern styles such as Hung Kuen, Choi Lei Fut, Hak Fu Mun, Wuzuquan, Wing Chun, and so on. Guangxi Wang (2012), pg. 22, "Nanquan is characterized by its strict regulation, compact movements and emphasis on lower-body. The forceful and quick Nanquan techniques require a balance between rigidity and flexibility, with rapidlychanging arm and hand positions. It is fairly unique in this aspect."

History and development of Southern Kung Fu
 
During the Ming Dynasty of the 16th century, there were Wokou (Japanese pirates) active on the coast of China. At one point, Generals Qi Jiguang and Yu Dayou were stationed in Fuqing and Putian in the Central Fujian. The local monks in those areas defended themselves using iron rods to repel the pirates. Yu Dayou and Qi Jiguang taught martial arts to the local armies and civilians to fight against the pirates, with General Qi teaching the use of javelins, knives and other weaponry.From Jixiao Xinshu. The fourteenth chapter of General Qi's Jixiao Xinshu includes a modified version of the 32nd posture of the Taizu Changquan. After Qi Jiguang left, the development of unarmed fighting methods was left for the soldiers.

Southern Shaolin Monastery

The Southern Shaolin Monastery is considered a significant development in the history of Shaolin Wushu in Southern China. The Tang Dynasty branched from the Shaolin Temple of Mount Song to Fujian. General Qi Jiguang of the Ming Dynasty would later import Taizu Changquan and other martial arts to the region.

The Concept of Burning (South) Shaolin Temple

The legend about the burning of the southern Shaolin Temple was recorded in a conference catalogue of the Guangzhou Hongmen Society meeting that took place in the late Qing Dynasty. It is believed that it was written based on the history of the time and the information acquired by the Hongmen at the end of the Ming Dynasty.

Contemporary Wushu Nanquan
The contemporary Wushu event Nanquan is a modern style created in 1960, and was derived from martial arts from the Chinese provinces south of the Yangtze River, predominantly those styles popular in Guangdong, Guangxi, Fujian and Zhejiang. The basis of contemporary Nánquán hails primarily from traditional Cantonese family styles of 洪 (Hung), 李 (Lei), 劉 (Lau), 莫 (Mok) and 蔡 (Choi), along with their more contemporary Kung Fu variants of Choi Lei Fut, Hung Ga and Wing Chun.

Contemporary Nanquan features vigorous, athletic movements with very stable, low stances, extensive hand techniques and a vocal articulation called fasheng ("release shout"), which is the predecessor of the Japanese and Korean martial arts kiai. Power is driven from sharp waist movements with special emphasis on fast stance transition to generate power and speed in the arms. Signature hand techniques of Nanquan are the consecutive downward strikes of the left and right fist called Gua Gai Quan (Gwa Kup Kuen; 挂盖拳), and consecutive upper cuts while driving forward called Paoquan (Pow Kuen''; 抛拳). There are relatively few kicks in Nanquan although the Tengkong Pantui Cepu (腾空盘腿度侧扑; "flying cross legs kick and land on the side") and Li Yu Da Ting (鲤鱼打挺直立; carp skip-up) are very common in advanced Nanquan routines. Nanquan also has its own contemporary weapons the Southern Broadsword (Nandao; 南刀) and Southern Staff (Nangun; 南棍), which were included in the International Wushu competition in 1999.

In 2003, the International Wushu Federation (IWUF) established rules of contemporary Nanquan to make jumping techniques (难度) mandatory in its Nanquan routines. Jump kicks spinning in mid-air between 360 and 720 degrees before touching the ground are now used in all IWUF Nanquan forms along with the Stationary Back Flip (原地后空翻) and the Single Step Back Tuck (单跳后空翻) for advanced IWUF competitors.

See also
 Northern and southern China
 Styles of Chinese martial arts
 Wushu (sport)

Bibliography

Notes

References

Events in wushu